Von Willebrand factor A domain containing 7 is a protein that in humans is encoded by the VWA7 gene.

See articles on Von Willebrand factor and on Von Willebrand factor type A domain.

References

Further reading